Gabriel Serville (born 27 September 1959) is a French-Guianese politician who was elected to the French National Assembly on 16 June 2012 representing French Guiana's 1st constituency. On 2 July 2021, he was elected President of the Assembly of French Guiana.

Biography 
Serville was born 27 September 1959 in Cayenne. His father was from Saint Lucia. Professionally, he was a mathematics professor.

Political career 
Serville served as mayor of Matoury from 2014 until 2017. He was a member of the Guianese Socialist Party from 2008 until 30 September 2017. In 2017, he founded Péyi Guyane.

Serville was first elected to the Member of French National Assembly on 20 June 2012. Serville held a position in the Bureau of the National Assembly of the 15th legislature of the French Fifth Republic as a secretary. For the 2021 regional elections, Péyi Guyane formed a union with La France Insoumise and Génération.s. Serville represented the union in the elections. On 2 July 2021, he was elected President of the French Guianese Assembly. He resigned his seat in the National Assembly on 1 August 2021.

Other activities 
 UNITE – Parliamentary Network to End HIV/AIDS, Viral Hepatitis and Other Infectious Diseases, Member (since 2019)

References

External links

   Biography on the French National Assembly website

Living people
1959 births
Presidents of the Assembly of French Guiana
Members of the Assembly of French Guiana
French Guianan educators
French Guianan politicians
Black French politicians
Deputies of the 14th National Assembly of the French Fifth Republic
Deputies of the 15th National Assembly of the French Fifth Republic
People from Cayenne
French Guianan people of Saint Lucian descent
Members of Parliament for French Guiana